Toshinori Muto (born 10 March 1978) is a Japanese professional golfer.

Muto was born in Gunma Prefecture. He currently plays on the Japan Golf Tour where he has won seven times between 2006 and 2019.

Professional wins (7)

Japan Golf Tour wins (7)

*Note: The 2011 Dunlop Phoenix Tournament was shortened to 54 holes due to rain.
1Co-sanctioned by the Asian Tour

Japan Golf Tour playoff record (1–1)

Results in major championships

Note: Muto only played in The Open Championship.

CUT = missed the half-way cut
"T" = tied

Results in World Golf Championships

"T" = Tied

External links

Japanese male golfers
Japan Golf Tour golfers
Sportspeople from Gunma Prefecture
1978 births
Living people
21st-century Japanese people